Adem İbrahimoğlu (born 1 January 1957, Bitola, North Macedonia) was a Turkish professional footballer who played as a goalkeeper.

Career 
He played 3 international matches which were all of them 1984 European Championship qualifiers and conceded 6 goals in these matches in 1983. In one of them he conceded 1 goal from a penalty kick in the match against Germany (lost by 1:5) on 26 March 1983.

Club and manager career 
İbrahimoğlu, who transferred to Eskişehirspor and had a successful performance here, is a football player who was the goalkeeper of Fenerbahçe in the 1978-81 seasons and Beşiktaş in the 1981-86 seasons. In Turkey national football team also worked in the same period Adam İbrahimoğlu, then Antalyaspor (1986–87), Bakirköyspor (1987–89), Eyup (1989-1990), in Nişantaşıspor (1990–91) have played and Elazığspor'un (1991 -1992) started to coach after quitting football. In 1996-98, he worked as the goalkeeper coach of the national team in Fatih Terim's team. Later, Çanakkale Dardanelspor worked as a goalkeeper coach in Beşiktaş youth team during the 2005-2006 season.

Successes 
Beşiktaş
 Turkish Football Championship: 1982-19 and 1985-19

References

External links 
 
 

Living people
1957 births
Sportspeople from Bitola
Turkish footballers
Turkey international footballers
Turkey youth international footballers
Macedonian footballers
Macedonian people of Turkish descent
Association football goalkeepers
Süper Lig players
TFF First League players
TFF Second League players
Eskişehirspor footballers
Fenerbahçe S.K. footballers
Beşiktaş J.K. footballers
Antalyaspor footballers
Bakırköyspor footballers
Gaziosmanpaşaspor footballers
Elazığspor footballers